Raghavan Pozhakadavil is an Indian National Congress politician from Thrissur and Member of the Legislative Assembly from Ollur Assembly Constituency in 1980 and 1982.

References

Indian National Congress politicians from Kerala
Politicians from Thrissur
Living people
Kerala MLAs 1980–1982
Kerala MLAs 1982–1987
Year of birth missing (living people)